Earl of Rochester is a title that was created twice in the Peerage of England. The first creation came in 1652 in favour of the Royalist soldier Henry Wilmot, 2nd Viscount Wilmot. He had already been created Baron Wilmot, of Adderbury in the County of Oxford, in 1643, also in the Peerage of England. He was the son of Charles Wilmot, who had been elevated to the Peerage of Ireland as Viscount Wilmot, of Athlone, in 1622. Lord Rochester died in 1658 and was succeeded by his son John Wilmot, 2nd Earl of Rochester. He was a poet, a friend of King Charles II, and the writer of satirical and bawdy poetry. He married the heiress Elizabeth Malet. He was succeeded on his death in 1680 by his only son, the third Earl. He, in turn, died at a young age the following year, when the titles became extinct.

The second creation came in 1682 in favour of the statesman and writer the Honourable Laurence Hyde. He was made Baron Wotton Basset and Viscount Hyde, of Kenilworth in the County of Warwick, at the same time, also in the Peerage of England. Hyde was the second son of Edward Hyde, 1st Earl of Clarendon. He was succeeded by his only son Henry, the second Earl. He notably served as Lord-Lieutenant of Cornwall. In 1723 he succeeded his cousin as fourth Earl of Clarendon. His only surviving son Henry Hyde, Viscount Cornbury, was summoned to the House of Lords through a writ of acceleration in his father's junior title of Baron Hyde in 1750. However, he died in May 1753, predeceasing his father by seven months. On Lord Clarendon and Rochester's death in December of the same year all the titles became extinct.

Viscounts Wilmot (1621)
Charles Wilmot, 1st Viscount Wilmot (1571–1644)
Henry Wilmot, 2nd Viscount Wilmot (1612–1658) (created Baron Wilmot in 1643 and Earl of Rochester in 1652)

Earls of Rochester; First creation (1652)
Henry Wilmot, 1st Earl of Rochester (1612–1658)
John Wilmot, 2nd Earl of Rochester (1647–1680)
Charles Wilmot, 3rd Earl of Rochester (1671–1681)

Earls of Rochester; Second creation (1682)
 Laurence Hyde, 1st Earl of Rochester (1642–1711)
 Henry Hyde, 4th Earl of Clarendon, 2nd Earl of Rochester (1672–1753)
Hon. Edward Hyde (d. 1702)
Hon. Laurence Hyde (1703–1704)
Henry Hyde, Viscount Cornbury, 5th Baron Hyde (1710–1753)

References

Extinct earldoms in the Peerage of England
Earls of Rochester
Noble titles created in 1652
Noble titles created in 1682
 Earl